Gordon Lynch is a former professional rugby league footballer who played in the 1990s. He played at club level for Stanley Rangers ARLFC, and Doncaster (Heritage № 690).

References

External links
Stanley Rangers ARLFC - Roll of Honour
Trio face referee reports

Doncaster R.L.F.C. players
Living people
Place of birth missing (living people)
Year of birth missing (living people)